Hylaeus sedens is a bee species endemic to Asia.

References

 http://animaldiversity.org/accounts/Hylaeus_sedens/classification/
 https://www.itis.gov/servlet/SingleRpt/SingleRpt?search_topic=TSN&search_value=755274
 https://www.gbif.org/species/119884721

Colletidae
Hymenoptera of Asia
Insects described in 1980